Santa Isabel do Rio Negro (Saint Isabel of Black River) is a municipality located in the Brazilian state of Amazonas. The Municipality was formerly called Tapuruquara.

Pico da Neblina, the highest mountain in Brazil at 2,994 metres (9,822 feet), is located in the municipality.

The municipality also contains part of the Amazonas National Forest.

The city is served by Tapuruquara Airport.

References

Municipalities in Amazonas (Brazilian state)
Populated places on the Rio Negro (Amazon)